Presley is a surname and given name.

Etymology
The name Presley is derived from the Old English preost, meaning "priest", and leah meaning "forest clearing".

History
Most instances of the surname Presley and variants Pressley and Pressly are thought to be ultimately of English origin. Later, if not found in some form originating also in Scotland, the name made its way across the border to that country, then on to Ireland and to the United States. However, some of the instances of the name in America may derive from a German surname Preslar (ultimately from Bressler, meaning 'from Breslau, Poland'), as individuals in some post-colonial American records are recorded under both names.

The surname came to prominence in the person of Elvis Presley, the American music icon, whose family may have originally come from Scotland and whose earliest documented ancestors were an Andrew Presley and an Elspeth Leg, who were based in the Aberdeenshire village of Lonmay. Their son, also called Andrew, who emigrated to the United States in 1745, was the first recorded Presley on American soil and the musician's direct ancestor of 7 generations.
It is possible that in Scotland, the surname originates with the Aberdeenshire hamlet of Persley, now encompassed by the City of Aberdeen. This location's name is probably derived from the Scottish Gaelic phreaslach, meaning "wooded place", or a Brittonic Pictish equivalent of the same word (c.f. Welsh phrysgwydden 'shrub'). The names Presley and Pressly to this day remain fairly common in Aberdeenshire but are sparse in the rest of Scotland.

In the United States and Australia, however, Presley is often an Anglicized form of German surnames such as Preslar and Presler. This is thought to be a habitational name from Breslau, Poland. Former President Jimmy Carter, through his mother, is thought to descend from Johann Valentin Preslar/Presler, who along with his family reached America and later the then frontier area of the central Carolinas sometime during the mid-18th century. Elvis Presley may have had the same ancestor.

Today, Presley ranks as the 1,825 most common surname in the United States.

People with the surname 

 Aeman Presley, American serial killer
 Alex Presley, American baseball player
 Annette Presley, New Zealand businesswoman
 Brian Presley, American actor
 Elvis Presley (1935-1977), American singer
 Gerald Presley, Canadian bobsledder
 Gladys Presley (1912-1958), Elvis Presley's mother
 Harold Ray Presley, American law enforcement officer
 Hovis Presley, English comedian
 Jenna Presley, American porn star
 Jim Presley, American baseball player
 Leo Presley, American footballer
 Lisa Marie Presley (1968–2023), American singer-songwriter, Elvis Presley's daughter
 Luther G. Presley, American songwriter and musician
 Priscilla Presley (born 1945), Elvis Presley's ex-wife
 Reg Presley, English singer/songwriter
 Sam Davis Presley, American sailor
 Sharon Presley, American activist
 Vernon Presley (1916-1979), Elvis Presley's father
 Wayne Presley, American ice hockey player

Variants of the surname 

 Anne Pressly, murdered KATV anchorwoman
 Ayanna Pressley, American politician
 Ebenezer Erskine Pressly
Eleanor C. Pressly, aeronautical engineer
 Jaime Pressly, American actress
 Jhurell Pressley, American football player
 Chris Pressley, American professional football player
 Harold Pressley, former American basketball player
 Henry Roosevelt Pressley, blues and soul instrumentalist
 Janet Pressley, American singer/songwriter
 Robert Pressley, former NASCAR driver
 Ryan Pressly, American professional baseball player
 Steven Pressley, Scottish footballer

People with the given name

 Presley Askew (1909–1994), American basketball and baseball coach
 Presley Carson (born 1968), retired Honduran football player
 Presley Chweneyagae, South African actor
 Presley Underwood Ewing, American politician
 Presley T. Glass, American politician
 Presley Hart, female model who was Penthouse magazine's Pet of the Month for March 2013
 Presley Neville O’Bannon, American soldier
 Presley Marion Rixey, American physician
 Presley Spruance, American merchant
 Presley Norton Yoder (1932–1993), Ecuadorian archaeologist and entrepreneur
 Presley Neville (1755–1818), American military officer

References

Surnames of English origin
English unisex given names